The 2009 European Youth Olympic Winter Festival was held between 15 and 20 February 2009 in Poland. The host cities are 5 cities in the Silesian province of Poland, namely Bielsko-Biala, Cieszyn, Szczyrk, Tychy, and Wisla.

Sports

Venues
Venues used:

Schedule
The competition schedule for the 2009 European Youth Olympic Winter Festival is as follows:

Medal table

References

External links
 Results

 
European Youth Olympic Winter Festival
2009 in Polish sport
2009 in European sport
International sports competitions hosted by Poland
Youth sport in Poland
2009 festivals
2009 in youth sport
February 2009 sports events in Europe